Andrea Podmaníková (born 23 February 1998) is a Slovak swimmer. She competed in the women's 100 metre breaststroke event at the 2017 World Aquatics Championships. In 2021, she represented Slovakia at the 2020 Summer Olympics held in Tokyo, Japan.

References

1998 births
Living people
Slovak female swimmers
Female breaststroke swimmers
Swimmers at the 2020 Summer Olympics
Olympic swimmers of Slovakia
Sportspeople from Topoľčany
20th-century Slovak women
21st-century Slovak women